Quello Huallayoc (possibly from Quechua q'illu yellow, walla mountain range, -yuq a suffix to indicate ownership, "the one with the yellow range") is a mountain in the Vilcanota mountain range in the Andes of Peru, about  high. It is located in the Cusco Region, Quispicanchi Province, Marcapata District. Quello Huallayoc lies southwest of the peak of Ccolcce and northeast of Yayamari and Huila Aje at the Yayamari valley.

References

Mountains of Cusco Region
Mountains of Peru